Sophie Linden  (born 27 February 1970) is a British politician, and currently the Deputy Mayor for Policing and Crime in London. She is a member of the Labour Party.

Education
Linden was educated at Emmanuel College, Cambridge from 1989 to 1992.

Political career 
Linden's entire career has been spent in politics. From 1992 to 1997, she was a researcher for David Blunkett MP. Following the Labour victory at the 1997 general election, she became a Special Adviser to Blunkett when he was Secretary of State for Education and Employment. She was in the role from 1997 to 2001, following Blunkett as Special Adviser when he was appointed Home Secretary.

Linden moved to become a Labour councillor within the London Borough of Hackney, for the Dalston Ward, from 4 May 2006 to 10 June 2016. During this period, she worked for Bell Pottinger political communications, and unsuccessfully sought selection as Labour's Prospective parliamentary candidate for Hampstead and Kilburn prior to the 2015 general election. In 2016, she was appointed by the new Mayor of London Sadiq Khan to be the Deputy Mayor for Policing and Crime.

References

1970 births
Councillors in the London Borough of Hackney
Living people
British women in politics
21st-century British politicians
21st-century British women politicians